The National Language Service promotes and facilitates communication across languages in South Africa.

The NLS' core objective is to meet the language requirements of the constitution{https://www.gov.za/documents/constitution-republic-south-africa-1996} by facilitating, promoting and providing a translation and editing service in all the official languages and by managing language diversity through language planning and terminology projects.

The NLS functions as the Government's professional language support system by translating official documents in all the official languages. Its terminology service assists with the development and modernisation of the technical vocabularies of the official languages. The language planning functions include advising the Government on the development of language policy and implementation strategies.

References

https://www.gov.za/documents/constitution-republic-south-africa-1996
https://www.gtac.gov.za/pepa/wp-content/uploads/2021/11/Language-Services-Summary.pdf

Languages of South Africa
Government agencies of South Africa
Year of establishment missing